The 1995 NCAA Division I Men's Golf Championships were contested at the 56th annual NCAA-sanctioned golf tournament for determining the individual and team national champions of men's collegiate golf at the Division I level in the United States.

The tournament was held at the Ohio State University Golf Club in Columbus, Ohio.

Oklahoma State won the team championship, the Cowboys' eighth NCAA title and first since 1991. Oklahoma State defeated defending champions Stanford in a play-off after the two teams finished tied atop the team standings (1,156–1,156). 

Chip Spratlin, from Auburn, won the individual title.

Individual results

Individual champion
 Chip Spratlin, Auburn (283)

Team results

Finalists

Eliminated after 36 holes

DC = Defending champions
Debut appearance

References

NCAA Men's Golf Championship
Golf in Ohio
NCAA Golf Championship
NCAA Golf Championship
NCAA Golf Championship